NGC 349 is a lenticular galaxy in the constellation Cetus. It was discovered on September 27, 1864 by Albert Marth. It was described by Dreyer as "very faint, very small."

References

External links
 

0349
18640927
Cetus (constellation)
Lenticular galaxies
003687